Griffith Observatory is an observatory in Los Angeles, California on the south-facing slope of Mount Hollywood in Griffith Park. It commands a view of the Los Angeles Basin including Downtown Los Angeles to the southeast, Hollywood to the south, and the Pacific Ocean to the southwest. The observatory is a popular tourist attraction with a close view of the Hollywood Sign and an extensive array of space and science-related displays. It is named after its benefactor, Griffith J. Griffith. Admission has been free since the observatory's opening in 1935, in accordance with the benefactor's will.

Over 7 million people have been able to view through the 12-inch (30.5 cm) Zeiss refractor since the observatory's 1935 opening; this is the most people to have viewed through any telescope. The «space» theme prevails in the interior.

History
On December 16, 1896,  of land surrounding the observatory was donated to the City of Los Angeles by Griffith J. Griffith. In his will Griffith donated funds to build an observatory, exhibit hall, and planetarium on the donated land. Griffith's objective was to make astronomy accessible to the public, as opposed to the prevailing idea that observatories should be located on remote mountaintops and restricted to scientists.

Griffith drafted detailed specifications for the observatory. In drafting the plans, he consulted with Walter Sydney Adams, the future director of Mount Wilson Observatory, and George Ellery Hale, who founded (with Andrew Carnegie) the first astrophysical telescope in Los Angeles.

As a Works Progress Administration (WPA) project, construction began on June 20, 1933, using a design developed by architects John C. Austin and Frederic Morse Ashley (1870-1960), based on preliminary sketches by Russell W. Porter. The observatory and accompanying exhibits were opened to the public on May 14, 1935, as the country's third planetarium. In its first five days of operation the observatory logged more than 13,000 visitors. Dinsmore Alter was the museum's director during its first years.

The building combines Greek and Beaux-Arts influences, and the exterior is embellished with the Greek key pattern.

During World War II, the planetarium was used to train pilots in celestial navigation. The planetarium was again used for this purpose in the 1960s to train Apollo program astronauts for the first lunar missions.

Griffith Observatory Foundation
Griffith Observatory Foundation was chartered in 1978 as Friends Of The Observatory. It was founded by Debra Griffith and Harold Griffith (the grandson of the observatory's benefactor) with Dr. E.C. Krupp (the current Observatory Director) and a small group of dedicated partners. The foundation supports the observatory in its mission of public astronomy and advocated the restoration and expansion of the observatory. The foundation continues to promote the observatory as an agent of science literacy, education, and experiential astronomy.

Renovation and expansion
The observatory closed on January 6, 2002 for renovation and a major expansion of exhibit space. It reopened to the public on November 2, 2006, retaining its Art Deco exterior. The $93 million renovation, paid largely by a public bond issue, restored the building, as well as replaced the aging planetarium dome. The building was expanded underground, with completely new exhibits, a café, gift shop, and the new Leonard Nimoy Event Horizon Theater.

A wildfire in the hills came dangerously close to the observatory on May 10, 2007.

On May 25, 2008, the Observatory offered visitors live coverage of the Phoenix landing on Mars.

On October 15, 2017, brush fires approached the Observatory Trail, but were extinguished before causing any structural damage.

On July 10, 2018, the Griffith Observatory was evacuated after a brush fire burned 25 acres and damaged cars but was extinguished before it damaged any buildings.

Ed Krupp has been the director of the Observatory since 1974. He has been responsible for updating the technology and the building for over 45 years.

Exhibits

The first exhibit visitors encountered in 1935 was the Foucault pendulum, which was designed to demonstrate the rotation of the Earth. The exhibits also included a 12-inch (305mm) Zeiss refracting telescope in the east dome, a triple-beam coelostat (solar telescope) in the west dome, and a thirty-eight foot relief model of the moon's north polar region.

Griffith requested that the observatory include a display on evolution which was accomplished with the Cosmochron exhibit which included a narration from Caltech Professor Chester Stock and an accompanying slide show. The evolution exhibit existed from 1937 to the mid-1960s.

Also included in the original design was a planetarium under the large central dome. The first shows covered topics including the Moon, worlds of the Solar System, and eclipses.

The planetarium theater was renovated in 1964 and a Mark IV Zeiss projector was installed.

The Café at the End of the Universe, an homage to Restaurant at the End of the Universe, is one of the many cafés run by celebrity chef Wolfgang Puck. In 2006 the 1964-vintage Zeiss Mark IV star projector was replaced with a Zeiss Mark IX Universarium. The former planetarium projector is part of the underground exhibit on ways in which humanity has visualized the skies.

Centered in the Universe features a high-resolution immersive video projected by an innovative laser system developed by Evans and Sutherland Corporation, along with a short night sky simulation projected by the Zeiss Universarium. A team of animators worked more than two years to create the 30-minute program. Actors, holding a glowing orb, perform the presentation, under the direction of Chris Shelton. Tickets for the show are purchased separately at the box office within the observatory. Tickets are sold on a first-come, first-served basis. Children under 5 are free, but are admitted to only the first planetarium show of the day. Only members of the observatory's support group, Friends Of The Observatory, may reserve tickets for the planetarium show.

The observatory is split up into six sections: The Wilder Hall of the Eye, the Ahmanson Hall of the Sky, the W. M. Keck Foundation Central Rotunda, the Cosmic Connection, the Gunther Depths of Space Hall, and the Edge of Space Mezzanine.

The Wilder Hall of the Eye, located in the east wing of the main level focuses on astronomical tools like telescopes and how they evolved over time so people can see further into space. Interactive features there include a Tesla coil and a "Camera Obscura", which uses mirrors and lenses to focus light onto a flat surface.

The Ahmanson Hall of the Sky, located in the west wing, focuses on objects that are normally found in the sky, like the Sun and Moon. The main centerpiece of this section is a large solar telescope projecting images of the Sun, using a series of mirrors called coelostats. Exhibits here include a periodic table of the elements, a Hertzsprung-Russell diagram, and several alcoves showing exhibits about topics like day and night, the paths of the Sun and stars, the seasons, the phases of the Moon, tides, and eclipses. 
The W. M. Keck Foundation Central Rotunda features several Hugo Ballin murals on the ceiling and upper walls restored since 1934, a Foucault pendulum that demonstrates the Earth's rotation, and a small exhibit dedicated to Griffith J. Griffith, after whom the observatory is named.

The Cosmic Connection is a 150 ft long hallway connecting the main building and the underground exhibition areas (see below) that depicts the history of the universe, and dramatizes the amount of time that has passed from the Big Bang to the present day using, hundreds of individual pieces of astronomy-related jewelry.

The Gunther Depths of Space Hall is the lower level of the observatory, dominated by "The Big Picture," and scale models of the Solar System. The planets (including dwarf planet Pluto) are shown relative to the size of the Sun, which is represented by the diameter of the Leonard Nimoy Event Horizon Theater. Below each planet are listed facts, as well as scales indicating a person's weight on planets having a solid surface (or weight at an altitude where atmospheric pressure would equal one bar otherwise). In addition, beneath the Earth's model, there is a small room containing a large model Earth globe, an older Zeiss planetarium projector, and a set of seismograph rolls, including one tracking room motion caused by occupants. The other rolls are attached to seismographs monitoring movement at the bedrock level, and indicate actual seismic activity. This image was taken over the course of 11 nights by the 48-inch Samuel Oschin telescope at Palomar Mountain. There is also a bronze statue of Albert Einstein sitting on a bench in the Depths of Space.

The Edge of Space Mezzanine, which overlooks the Depths of Space Hall, focuses more on astronomy related topics that involve celestial bodies much closer to Earth, with exhibits including meteorite displays, an asteroid impact simulator, cloud and spark chambers, a large globe of the Moon, and telescopes that allow inspection of The Big Picture from a distance.

Tesla coil

On display at the Observatory is a large Tesla coil, named for its inventor, Nikola Tesla. Dubbed "GPO-1", it is one of a pair which were built in 1910 by Earle Ovington. Ovington, who would go on to fame as an aviator, ran a company which built high voltage generators for medical X-ray and electrotherapy devices. In public demonstrations of his generators, the spectacular displays drew crowds. Ovington designed the Observatory's coil to surpass a coil made by Elihu Thomson in 1893 which generated a 64-inch spark. (Tesla had secretly produced much larger sparks in 1899.) The project caught the attention of an Edison Electric Illuminating Company official, who offered $1,000 if the coil were displayed at an upcoming electrical show in Madison Square Garden, with the stipulation that the machine would produce sparks not less than ten feet long.

The machine, dubbed the Million Volt Oscillator was installed in the band balcony overlooking the arena. At the top of each hour the lights in the main hall were shut off, and sparks would shoot from the copper ball atop the coil to a matching coil 122 inches away, or to a wand held by an assistant. The chief engineer of the General Electric Company estimated that the discharges were at least 1.3 million volts.

Ovington, who died in 1936, gave the matching Tesla coils to his old electrotherapy colleague Frederick Finch Strong, who in 1937 donated them to Griffith Observatory.  The Observatory had room to exhibit only one of the pair.  By this time the machine was missing parts, so Observatory staffer Leon Hall restored it with the notable assistance of Hollywood special effects expert Kenneth Strickfaden who designed the special effects for Frankenstein (1931) among many other movies.

Astronomers Monument

The Astronomers Monument on the front lawn of the Observatory that pays homage to six of the greatest astronomers of all time: Hipparchus (about 150 BC); Nicolaus Copernicus (1473–1543); Galileo Galilei (1564–1642); Johannes Kepler (1571–1630); Isaac Newton (1642–1727); and William Herschel (1738–1822). The 1934 New Deal artwork, which was a collaboration between six local artists, is topped with an armillary sphere.

Visiting

Admission to the building and grounds of Griffith Observatory is free of charge. Planetarium shows at the Observatory are offered eight times a day on weekdays and ten times a day on weekends. A nominal fee is charged for admission to the planetarium shows. As long as the weather permits, the Observatory offers free public telescope viewing every night the observatory is open - usually beginning at 7:00 p.m. This includes the historic 12” Zeiss Refracting Telescope on the roof, and up to four portable telescopes placed outside offering views of visible celestial objects for the night. At 9:30 p.m., the doors to the Zeiss dome close, and lines for the portable telescopes outside stop allowing guests into the queues - though the lines may close earlier on the busier nights. In poor weather, the roof may be closed to the public, but if still accessible under overcast skies, the Zeiss Telescope can still be visited as an exhibit during viewing hours.

There is a small parking lot next to the Observatory, plus more spaces along Western Canyon Rd, which require payment of $8–10 an hour, depending on the season. During busier times, the roads can get congested and limit access to the top. The Los Angeles Department of Transportation (LADOT) operates daily low cost DASH Observatory public bus service from the Vermont/Sunset Metro Red Line station to the Observatory, including a stop at the nearby Greek Theater, which can be used as a free parking area when there are no concerts. The observatory is closed on Mondays.

There are photo opportunities and scenery at and around the Observatory, with views of the Pacific Ocean, the Hollywood Sign and Downtown Los Angeles.

Filming location

Film
The observatory was featured in two major sequences of the James Dean film Rebel Without a Cause (1955), which helped to make it an international emblem of Los Angeles. A bust of Dean was subsequently placed at the west side of the grounds.  It has also appeared in a number of other movies, including:

 The Pagemaster (1994)
 The Phantom Empire (1935)
 Dick Tracy Returns (1938)
 Phantom from Space (1953)
 Tobor the Great (1954)
 Teen-Age Crime Wave (1955)
 War of the Colossal Beast (1958)
 The Cosmic Man (1959)
 The Spy with My Face (1964)
 The Split (1968)
 Flesh Gordon (1974)
 Midnight Madness (1980)
 The Terminator (1984)
 Back to the Future (1985)
 Dragnet (1987)
The tunnel entrance to the Observatory on Mount Hollywood Drive is the entrance to Toontown in the movie Who Framed Roger Rabbit (1988).
 Earth Girls Are Easy (1988)
 Back to the Future Part II (1989)
 The Rocketeer (1991)
 Devil in a Blue Dress (1995)
 The Power Within (1995)
 The People vs. Larry Flynt (1996)
 The End of Violence (1997)
 Bowfinger (1999)
 House on Haunted Hill (1999 remake)
 Queen of the Damned (2002)
 Charlie's Angels: Full Throttle (2003)
 Transformers (2007 live-action film)
 Yes Man (2008)
 Terminator Salvation (2009)
 Valentine's Day (2010; In the opening scene of credits in the theater version a quick shot of the Observatory is shown)
 Friends with Benefits (2011)
 Love and Mercy (2014)
 McFarland, USA (2015; Final cross-country race winds past the Observatory)
 San Andreas (2015; It is seen briefly in a shot of L.A.)
 Terminator Genisys (2015)
 La La Land (2016)
 Sandy Wexler (2017)
 Under the Silver Lake (2018)
 Hotel Artemis (2018; It is seen briefly in the opening sequence of the movie in a news report. The observatory appears to be on fire)
   Elvis (2022)

Television
The Observatory has appeared in episodes of the following TV shows:

 24 ("Day 1 3:00–4:00 pm"; aired on March 19, 2002)
 90210 (location shots of the Observatory many times)
 Adele One Night Only (2021 CBS special; concert portion filmed at Observatory)
 Adventures of Superman (first episode, as Jor-El's laboratory on Superman's home planet Krypton; some other episodes, as the Metropolis observatory)
 Alias ("The Coup")
 Agent Carter Season 2 episode 2: "A View in the Dark", January 2016
 The Amazing Race (Starting Line for the 22nd season)
 Angel (episode "Are You Now or Have You Ever Been," with Angel wearing a red jacket in homage to James Dean's Rebel Without a Cause character).
 Angie Tribeca (Season 4 Episode 9 "Irrational Treasures")
 Archer (features prominently in the 2017, season 8 episode "Archer Dreamland: Sleepers Wake")
 Beverly Hills, 90210 ("Rebel with a Cause")
 BoJack Horseman (in animated form in "The Telescope", "Later", "That's Too Much, Man!”, “A Horse Walks into Rehab”, and is prominently featured in Season 6's opening credits)
 Buffy the Vampire Slayer (episode "Shadow")
 Brothers and Sisters ("The Road Ahead")
 Cannon Season 4 episode 22: "Vengeance" March 1975
 CHiPs
 Criminal Minds ("Nanny Dearest")
 Dancing with the Stars (opening performance for season premiere of Season 23)
 Danny Phantom (The Amity Park Observatory modeled on Griffith Observatory.)
 Dragnet ("The LSD Story" aka "Blueboy" episode)
 Episodes
 Goliath Season 2, episode 8
 Honey West ("The Abominable Snowman")
 Hunter, Part Three of the trilogy City Under Siege
 In the Heat of the Night ("Just a Country Boy")
 Jonas (Date Expectations)
 Keeping up with the Kardashians on E! shows shots of Griffith Observatory on a regular basis.
 The Late Late Show with Craig Ferguson (appears at the beginning of the opening title sequence, 2009 to 2015)
 Logan's Run (episode 10 "Futurepast" January 1978)
 Lucifer (ending of season 3 bonus episode "Once Upon a Time")
 MacGyver (pilot episode)
 Macross Frontier (a future replica of the Griffith Observatory.)
 The Man from U.N.C.L.E.
 Melrose Place ("Till Death Do Us Part")
 Millionaire Matchmaker (shown in random episodes)
 Mission: Impossible (1966 TV series; opening pilot episode, plus the location of two mission briefings in two subsequent episodes)
 The Monkees (footage incorporated into musical sequences)
 Moonlight
 2010 MTV Video Music Awards. Linkin Park performed their single "The Catalyst" at the Observatory 
 The New Adventures of Wonder Woman (Season 3 episode "Time Bomb" 1979)
 Quantum Leap ("Goodbye Norma Jean")
 Remington Steele
 The Rookie (Season 4, Episode 6: Poetic Justice)
 Rocky Jones, Space Ranger
 She-Hulk: Attorney at Law (Season 1, Episode 1; A picture of the observatory hangs in Jennifer Walter's office)
 The Simpsons (duplicated as Springfield Observatory)
 Star Trek: Voyager (two-part episode "Future's End")
 Top Chef (site of opening challenge for the 17th season)
 The Wonder Years

Other media
 The song "Observatory Crest" from Captain Beefheart and The Magic Band's album Bluejeans & Moonbeams is about two lovers spending a romantic evening at Griffith Observatory. Lead vocalist Don Van Vliet lived nearby and frequently visited it in his youth.
 It was a filming location for the music video for "Rush Rush" by Paula Abdul which starred Keanu Reeves and was directed by Stefan Würnitzer. This video was based on Rebel Without a Cause.
 An image of the observatory is shown in a 2Pac music video, "To Live & Die in L.A.". The video pays homage to Los Angeles and its best known landmarks.
 Some interview segments with rock musician Ringo Starr for the Beatles Anthology video were conducted on the observatory grounds during the mid-1990s.  Starr and Neil Aspinall are shown viewing Los Angeles from the Observatory.
 It appears in the video games Mafia II, L.A. Noire, Grand Theft Auto: San Andreas, Grand Theft Auto V, Vampire: The Masquerade - Bloodlines, Command & Conquer: Red Alert 3, Wasteland 2 and The Crew.
 On September 12, 2010, Linkin Park performed a brief set for a thousand fans onsite.  "The Catalyst" from this performance was later shown by MTV for that night's Video Music Awards.
 The photographs on the cover of The Byrds' album Untitled were taken on the staircase of Griffith Observatory.
 In the comic Runaways, the Runaways battle Geoffrey Wilder at Griffith Observatory, which is destroyed in the fight.
 Cartoonist Bill Griffith is known for his satirical cartoon commentary on American culture and values. He drew and released a one-shot magazine format collection of "one-pager" treatments of odd bits of American cultural life, entitled "Griffith Observatory". It opens with a clever premise piece, in which he falls into the opportunity to rent the actual Griffith Observatory as a living space. The agent showing the property mentions the telescope in an offhand way as a "plus", and Bill realizes it would be a tremendous boon to his amateur anthropological pastime.
 In 2019, a photo of the observatory was one of many splash screens for Windows 10.

See also
 Don Dixon –  Observatory Art Director
 Joy Picus, Los Angeles City Council member, 1977–1991, president of Friends of Griffith Observatory
 Laura Danly  – Observatory Curator
 Los Angeles Historic–Cultural Monuments in Hollywood and Los Feliz
 Fabra Observatory – Spanish observatory on a hill overlooking a metropolis

Explanatory notes

References

External links

 
 Griffith Observatory Foundation
 Collection of articles on the observatory at the Los Angeles Times
 Live Lecturers sent into a Black Hole by Danny King at Bloomberg News
 Make Astronomers the Stars Op/Ed by Margaret Wertheim in the Los Angeles Times
 Light Pollution in L.A. Area
 Image of visitors at an exhibit in the newly opened Griffith Observatory, Los Angeles, 1935. Los Angeles Times Photographic Archive (Collection 1429). UCLA Library Special Collections, Charles E. Young Research Library, University of California, Los Angeles.

Observatory
Art Deco architecture in California
Astronomical observatories in California
Los Angeles Historic-Cultural Monuments
Museums in Los Angeles
Planetaria in the United States
Science and technology in Greater Los Angeles
Science museums in California
Tourist attractions in Los Angeles
Museums established in 1935
1935 establishments in California
Los Feliz, Los Angeles